Fritz Vahrenholt  (born May 8, 1949, in Gelsenkirchen-Buer) is a German politician (SPD), industrialist and a climate change denier.

Biography

Vahrenholt had studied chemistry in Münster and started his professional career at the federal  Umweltbundesamt (environmental protection agency) in Berlin and the Ministry for Environment of Hesse. From 1984 till 1990 he was in a leading role in Hamburg, first as Staatsrat for environment, 1990 to 1991 for the administral Senatskanzlei, and the Umweltsenator (senator for the environment) in Hamburg from 1991 to 1997.

In 1998 he entered the energy industry and until 2001 was on the Board of Deutsche Shell AG, a Shell subsidiary. In 2001 he moved to post of CEO of the wind turbine company REpower Systems AG and remained there until 2007. From February 2008 to June 2012 he was CEO of electric power company RWE subsidiary RWE Innogy and remains on the supervisory board. Vahrenholt has a doctorate in chemistry. In 1999 he was made a Honorary Professor of chemistry at the University of Hamburg.

In 2019, he was ejected with immediate effect from this function.

Global warming denial
Vahrenholt belongs to the minority that is dismissive about human-induced global warming. In 2012 Vahrenholt together with geologist Sebastian Lüning published Die kalte Sonne: warum die Klimakatastrophe nicht stattfindet (The Cold Sun: Why the Climate Crisis Isn't Happening), a book asserting that climate change is driven by variations in solar activity. They predict the Earth is entering a cooling phase due to periodic solar cycles, and will cool by 0.2 to 0.3 degrees C by 2035. Other contributors are Nir Shaviv, Werner Weber, Henrik Svensmark and Nicola Scafetta. Numerous scientists, including the Council for Sustainable Development
, criticised the book and considered its underlying assumptions to be either outdated or highly speculative. The later events showed that in spite of a quite low activity of the sun during the Solar cycle 24, as had been forecast in principle by Vahrenholt, the result of global cooling forecast by Vahrenholt did not occur; the earth rather heated up even more.

References

External links
Die Kalte Sonne  Vahrenholt and Lüning's blog regarding their climate change theories.

1949 births
Businesspeople from Hamburg
Senators of Hamburg
RWE
German chief executives
Businesspeople in electricity
University of Münster alumni
Living people